Prudentius Maran 	(14 October 1683, at Sezanne, Marne2 April 1762, at Paris) was a French Benedictine scholar of the Maurist Congregation, known as a patrologist.

Life

After studying humanities at Paris he became a Benedictine at the abbey of St. Faron near Meaux on 30 January 1703, and continued his studies at the abbey of St. Denis. He was then sent to Saint-Germain-des-Prés to collaborate with his confrere Antoine-Augustin Touttée in the edition of the works of Cyril of Jerusalem.

In 1734 he was forced to leave St. Germain-des-Pres at the instance of Cardinal Bissy, who suspected him of keeping his confreres from accepting the Bull Unigenitus. After spending a year at the abbey of Orbais, he was sent to St. Martin de Pontoise and in 1737 he was transferred to the abbey of Blancs-Manteaux, where he spent the remainder of his life.

Works

His knowledge of theology and patristics is attested by the introductions which he prefixed to his critical editions of Greek and Latin Fathers, as well as by other works.

His masterpiece is the edition of the works of Justin Martyr: Justini philos. et martyris opera quae extant omnia necnon Tatiani, Athenagorae S. Theophili, Hermiae. He further edited:

the works of Cyril of Jerusalem which had been prepared by Touttée: "S. Cyrilli Hieros. opera";
the works of St. Cyprian which had been begun by Étienne Baluze: "S. Cypriani opera", to which he prefixed a basic life of St. Cyprian;
the third volume of the works of St. Basil, the two first volumes of which had been completed by Garnier.

His other works, all anonymous, are

"Dissertation sur les Sémiariens"(Paris, 1722);
"Divinitas domini nostri Jesu Christi manifesta in scripturis et traditione" (Paris, 1746, new ed., Würzburg,1859);
"La divinite de Jesus Christ prouvée contre les hérétiques et les déistes", 3 vols. (Paris, 1751);
"La doctrine de l'écriture et des pères sur les guérisons miraculeuses" (Paris, 1754);
"Les grandeurs de Jésus Christ avec la defense de sa divinité" (Paris, 1756).

Notes

References

Attribution
 The entry cites:
Tassin, Hist. litt. de la congreg. de Saint-Maur (Brussels, 1770), 741-9 (Germ. tr., Frankfurt, 1773), II, 541-553;
Le Cerf, Bibliothèque hist. et crit. des auteurs de la congreg. de Saint-Maur (The Hague, 1726), 293-8;
Lama, Bibl. des ecrivains de la Congreg. de Saint-Maur (Munich and Paris, 1882), 180-2;
Hurter, Nomenclator Literarius, IV, 3rd ed. (Innsbruck, 1810), 1452-5.

1683 births
1762 deaths
French Benedictines